Puntius pugio is a species of ray-finned fish in the genus Puntius. It is found in Myanmar.

References 

Puntius
Fish described in 2008